Andresen Island, also known as "Isla Curanilahue", is an island  long and rising over , lying in the middle of the entrance to Lallemand Fjord, off the west coast of Graham Land. It was discovered by the French Antarctic Expedition, 1908–10, under Jean-Baptiste Charcot, and named by him for the manager of the Magellan Whaling Co at the company's Deception Island base, who provided coal for the expedition.

See also 
 List of Antarctic and subantarctic islands

References 

Islands of Graham Land
Loubet Coast